Max Johnston may refer to:

Max Johnston (footballer) (born 2003), Scottish football defender (Motherwell FC, Queen of the South FC)
Max Johnston (musician) (fl. 1992–2014), American folk musician (Uncle Tupelo, Wilco)
Max Johnston (racing driver) (born 1993), Australian stock car racing driver